The TNCA Series C Microplano was a single-engine, single-seat fighter designed and built in Mexico during World War I.

Design
From 1915 the Talleres Nacionales de Construcciones Aeronáuticas - (National Aeronautical Construction Workshops), sometimes known as the Military Aviation Factory, produced several series of Mexican aircraft.  Some of these were based on European designs but others were indigenous. Pressure for local designs and production was increased by the concentration of European manufacturers on war production, in addition to the tensions between Mexico and the United States. In 1917 rights to build Spanish Hispano-Suiza engines was acquired and a factory established.

The Series C Microplano was an unequal span single bay biplane, with wings without sweep or stagger connected by pairs of vertical,  parallel interplane struts on each side, the forward ones a little closer to the fuselage. Both wings had constant chord and squared tips. There was a triangular cut-out in the trailing edge of the upper wing to improve the pilot's view.

The Microplano had a flat sided, rectangular section fuselage.  The nose housed a 115 kW (157 hp) Hispano-Suiza water-cooled engine, driving a two bladed propeller.  Behind the underwing single seat open cockpit the fuselage narrowed strongly in both height and width.  Both the near circular rudder and semi-circular tailplane were all-moving.  There was a fixed conventional undercarriage with mainwheels on V-form struts, assisted by a tailskid.

Specifications

References

1910s Mexican military aircraft
Single-engined tractor aircraft
Aircraft first flown in 1918